Marcus Vinícius Dias, also commonly known as Marcus Vinícius (January 22, 1923 – 1992), was a Brazilian Olympic basketball player.

Dias was born in Rio de Janeiro, and competed in the 1948 Summer Olympics. There he won the bronze medal with the Brazilian basketball team under the guidance of head coach Moacyr Daiuto.

References

External links
 profile
 Profile

1923 births
1992 deaths
Brazilian men's basketball players
Olympic basketball players of Brazil
Basketball players at the 1948 Summer Olympics
Olympic bronze medalists for Brazil
Basketball players from Rio de Janeiro (city)
Olympic medalists in basketball
Medalists at the 1948 Summer Olympics